QGtkStyle is an open-source startup project to create a GTK+ layer for Qt-based applications running on GTK2-based desktops. It intends to make Qt applications blend perfectly into GTK-based desktop environments such as GNOME.

QGtkStyle currently requires gtk2 development packages and Qt 4.4 and can be freely downloaded from SVN repository of Trolltech Labs.

Released under the terms of GNU General Public License 3.

QGtkStyle was incorporated in Qt starting with version 4.5.

See also 
 GTK-Qt (GTK-Qt at kde-look.org)
 QtCurve (QtCurve at kde-look.org)

References

External links 
 QGtkStyle at Trolltech Labs
 QGtkStyle at Google Code
 Introducing QGtkStyle by Thom Holwerda at OSNews, May 15, 2008
 QGtkStyle Offers Native Gtk Look For Qt Programs at Slashdot, May 15, 2008

GNOME
GTK
KDE
Qt (software)
Widget toolkits
X Window System